Wiehoff is a river of Hesse, Germany. It flows into the Ems near Bad Emstal-Merxhausen.

See also
List of rivers of Hesse

Rivers of Hesse
Rivers of Germany